Onassis: The Richest Man in the World is a 1988 American-Spanish made-for-television biographical film directed by Waris Hussein and starring Raul Julia as Aristotle Onassis.

Premise
Biography of the life of Aristotle Onassis (Raul Julia), a Greek who rose to become one of the world's wealthiest men, detailing his rise to power and unhappy marriages.

Cast
 Raul Julia as Aristotle Onassis
Elias Koteas as Young Aristotle Onassis
 Jane Seymour as Maria Callas
 Anthony Quinn as Socrates Onassis
 Francesca Annis as Jacqueline Kennedy Onassis
 Beatie Edney as Tina
 Anthony Zerbe as Livanos
 John Kapelos as Costas Gratsos

Accolade
For her portrayal as Maria Callas, Jane Seymour won the Primetime Emmy Award for Outstanding Supporting Actress in a Limited Series or Movie.

References

External links
 

Films based on non-fiction books
American biographical films
Films set in the 20th century
1980s biographical films
Spanish drama films
1988 television films
1988 films
American Broadcasting Company television specials
Films directed by Waris Hussein
Films scored by Billy Goldenberg
Cultural depictions of Aristotle Onassis
1980s English-language films
1980s American films